Reuben Wright House is a historic home located at Westfield in Chautauqua County, New York. It is a two-story, eight bay structure built primarily of brick. The earliest portion of the dwelling was apparently built in the early 1830s and it is one of the earliest extant structures in the area.  For some time in the mid-19th century the dwelling operated as a tavern and known as the Drovers Inn.

It was listed on the National Register of Historic Places in 1983.

References

Houses on the National Register of Historic Places in New York (state)
Federal architecture in New York (state)
Houses completed in 1830
Houses in Chautauqua County, New York
U.S. Route 20
1830 establishments in New York (state)
National Register of Historic Places in Chautauqua County, New York